The Flaming Lips with Lightning Bolt is a collaborative EP by The Flaming Lips and Lightning Bolt, released in 2011. The four-track EP includes four tracks ranging in length from six to eleven minutes. The first two tracks are credited to The Flaming Lips with Lightning Bolt, while the latter two are credited to Lightning Bolt with The Flaming Lips.

Musical style

Critical reception

Upon release, The Flaming Lips with Lightning Bolt was greeted with a mixed critical reaction.

Track listing

Track listing adapted from AllMusic and Stereogum.

References

2011 EPs
Collaborative albums
Lightning Bolt (band) albums
The Flaming Lips EPs